Down to the Moon is Andreas Vollenweider's fifth studio album, released in 1986. It was re-released in 2005 and again in 2006.
It was the first album to win the Grammy Award for Best New Age Album in 1987.

Track listing
All songs written and arranged by Andreas Vollenweider.
"Down To The Moon" - 2:26
"Moon Dance" - 4:11
"Steam Forest" - 4:56
"Water Moon" - 2:15
"Night Fire Dance" - 4:57
"Quiet Observer" - 2:43
"Silver Wheel" - 3:57
"Drown in Pale Light" - 2:13
"The Secret, The Candle and Love" - 3:44
"Hush - Patience at Bamboo Forest" - 0:12
"Three Silver Ladies Dance" - 2:40
"La Lune et L'enfant" - 2:00

Charts

Personnel
Andreas Vollenweider: Harp
Christoph Stiefel: Keyboards, Synthesizers
Pedro Haldemann: Bells
Walter Keiser: Drums 
Jon Otis: Percussion
Max Laesser: Strings (Arranged the Silver Symphony Orchestra and Choir)
Matthias Ziegler: Woodwinds

Certifications

References

Andreas Vollenweider albums
1986 albums
Grammy Award for Best New Age Album
Epic Records albums